Leopoldo de' Medici (6 November 1617 – 10 November 1675) was an Italian cardinal, scholar, patron of the arts and Governor of Siena. He was the brother of Ferdinando II de' Medici, Grand Duke of Tuscany.

Biography

Prince Leopoldo was born at the Palazzo Pitti in Florence, the capital of the Grand Duchy of Tuscany then ruled by his father, Grand Duke Cosimo II. His mother Maria Magdalena of Austria was a sister of Queen Margarita of Spain and Ferdinand II, Holy Roman Emperor. 

Leopoldo was educated under Jacopo Soldano, Father Flaviano Michelini and Evangelista Torricelli. When his brother was elected Grand Duke, Leopoldo acted as his advisor for manufactures, agriculture and trades. Leopoldo, a disciple of Galileo, took a real interest in the proceedings of the justly celebrated academy 'Del Cimento' (the test), signing its correspondence, following closely the work of Evangelista Torricelli da Modigliana, inventor of the barometer. 

He took a great interest in science and technology. In 1638 he founded the Accademia Platonica, and, together with Ferdinando, the Accademia del Cimento ("Academy of Experiment") in 1657 to promote observation of nature through the Galileian Method. In 1641 Leopoldo had been named member of the Accademia della Crusca, for which he edited the entries regarding art for the 3rd edition of the Crusca Dictionary (1691).

Leopoldo was also a great collector of rare books, paintings (the Venetian collection at the Uffizi is inherited from him), drawings, statues, coins and self-portraits. He left a wide correspondence with artists and art collectors of his time. He experimented with telescopic lenses and all manner of scientific instruments, and also commissioned those thermometers, astrolabes, calorimeters, quadrants, hygrometers, quadrants and other ingenious mechanical devices which visitors to the Pitti Palace saw displayed in such profusion. Leopoldo spent four hours each day 'up to his neck in books'. 

On 12 December 1667 Pope Clement IX named him cardinal of Santi Cosma e Damiano. From that point on Leopoldo made frequent trips to Rome, pursuing his artistic interests. He died in 1675. His large collections are included in several museums of Florence. 

Leopoldo had a long correspondence with Christiaan Huygens.

Ancestors

References

 

|-

  

|-

1617 births
1675 deaths
Nobility from Florence
Governors of Siena
17th-century Italian cardinals
Italian art collectors
Leopoldo
Museum founders
Clergy from Florence
17th-century Italian nobility
Burials at San Lorenzo, Florence
Sons of monarchs